The SCP Foundation is a fictional secret organization documented by the collaborative-writing wiki project of the same name. Within the website's shared universe, the Foundation is responsible for capturing, containing, and studying various paranormal, supernatural, and other mysterious phenomena unexplained by science (known as "anomalies" or "SCPs"), while also keeping their existence hidden from the rest of human society. 

The collaborative writing project operates on the wiki-like website SCP Wiki, and includes elements of many genres such as horror, science fiction, and urban fantasy.  The majority of works on the SCP Wiki consist of thousands of SCP files: mock confidential scientific reports that document various SCPs and associated containment procedures. The website also contains "Foundation Tales", short stories featuring various characters and settings in the SCP universe. The wiki's literary works have been praised for their ability to convey horror through a quasi-scientific and academic writing style, as well as for their high standards of quality.

The SCP universe has inspired numerous fan-made adaptations in widely varying forms of media; including books, comics, video games, animated and live-action short films.

Overview of the SCP universe
The fictional setting centers around the findings and activities of the SCP Foundation: an international secret society consisting of a scientific research institution with a paramilitary intelligence agency to support their goals. Despite their extremely secretive nature, the Foundation is entrusted by governments around the world to capture and contain various unexplained paranormal phenomena that defy the known laws of nature (referred to as "anomalies", "SCP objects", "SCPs", or informally as "skips"). They include living beings and creatures, artifacts and objects, locations and places, abstract concepts, and incomprehensible entities which display supernatural abilities or other extremely unusual properties. If left uncontained, many of the more dangerous anomalies will pose a serious threat to humans or even all life on Earth. All information regarding the existence of the Foundation and SCPs are strictly withheld from the general public in order to prevent mass hysteria that would supposedly occur if they were leaked, and allow human civilization to continue functioning under a masquerade of "normalcy".

Whenever an SCP anomaly is discovered, teams of undercover Foundation agents (often called Mobile Task Forces, or MTFs) are deployed to either collect and transport the object to one of the organization's many secret facilities, or to contain it at its location of discovery if transportation is not possible. If an anomaly is too widespread, elusive, or otherwise inaccessible, containment usually consists of suppressing all knowledge of the SCP from the public. This is accomplished through censorship of mass media, and by dosing all eyewitnesses with amnestic drugs which erase their memories of anomalous events.

At the Foundation's secret facilities, SCPs are studied and researched by scientists in order to improve containment methods for them. The Foundation also acquires disposable human test subjects called D-class personnel, who are usually (though not always) convicted criminals taken from prisons around the world; and forces them to take part in experiments with potentially dangerous SCPs, in order to avoid risking the safety of Foundation employees themselves. The Foundation maintains documentation for all SCPs which they are aware of, which can include or link to related reports and files. These documents describe the SCPs and include instructions for keeping them safely contained, as well as supplementary incident reports or experimentation logs.

Apart from the Foundation itself, there are numerous rival organizations (collectively referred to as Groups of Interest, or GOIs) which are also actively involved with the paranormal world. Notable examples include the Chaos Insurgency, a terrorist splinter group consisting of ex-Foundation defectors who attempt to capture and weaponize SCPs; the Global Occult Coalition (GOC), a secret paramilitary agency of the United Nations which specializes in destroying supernatural threats instead of containing them; and the Serpent's Hand, a militant group which advocates for the rights of anomalous beings, resisting both the Foundation's and GOC's efforts to suppress paranormal activity worldwide. Other GOIs seek to exploit anomalies by producing or selling them for monetary profit; or using them to serve their own religious, political, or ideological goals.

Examples of SCPs 

 SCP-055 is a mysterious memory-erasing anomaly known as an "antimeme" that causes anyone who examines it to forget its existence, thus making the object's characteristics indescribable except in terms of what it is not.
 SCP-087 is a staircase that appears to descend infinitely and inhibits any light within its space. The staircase is inhabited by an entity known as SCP-087-1: a disembodied floating face without a mouth, pupils or nostrils, which chases after anyone walking down the stairs.
 SCP-108 is a Nazi bunker system that is accessible only through a portal found in a woman's nose.
 SCP-173 is a humanoid statue composed of rebar, concrete and Krylon spray paint. It is immobile when directly observed, but it attacks people and breaks their neck when line of sight with it is broken. It is extremely fast, to the point where it can move multiple meters while the observer is blinking. In real life, SCP-173 is notable for being the first SCP ever written.
 SCP-294 is a coffee vending machine that can dispense anything that does or can exist in liquid formincluding, on occasion, abstract concepts. Regardless of the properties of the substance chosen, the machine's polystyrene cups appear to suffer no damage from the substances dispensed into them.
 SCP-426 is a toaster that can only be referred to in the first person.
 SCP-999 is a gelatinous slime mold-like creature that smells similar to whatever is most comforting to the person it makes contact with. It has a friendly personality and is known to induce positive emotions on contact with humans and other organisms. Therefore, it is sometimes used as a tool by the SCP Foundation.
 SCP-1171 is a home whose windows are covered in condensation; by writing in the condensation on the glass, it is possible to communicate with an extra-dimensional entity whose windows are likewise covered in condensation. This entity bears significant enmity towards humans but does not know that the Foundation members are humans.
 SCP-1609 is a wood chip mulch that teleports into the lungs of individuals displaying aggressive behavior towards it. Previously a benevolent chair that teleported to nearby individuals who needed to sit down, it became aggressive after being destroyed in a woodchipper by the Global Occult Coalition.
 SCP-3008 is an IKEA store with an interior that contains a seemingly infinite, labyrinthine pocket dimension designated SCP-3008-1. Prospective customers trapped within the building have formed rudimentary civilizations, and must defend themselves against hostile creatures known as SCP-3008-2: which are tall, faceless humanoids wearing IKEA employee uniforms that become violently aggressive towards all nearby humans when the lights are turned off.

Writing style
On the SCP Wiki, the majority of works are stand-alone articles detailing the "Special Containment Procedures" of a given SCP object. In a typical article, an SCP object is assigned a unique identification number and a "containment class" based on the difficulty of containing it. The documentation then outlines proper containment procedures and safety measures before describing the SCP object in question. Addenda (such as images, research data, interviews, history, or status updates) may also be attached to the document. The reports are written in a scientific tone and often censor words with black bars (ex. █████) and [DATA EXPUNGED] markings. As of August 2021, articles exist for nearly 6,600 SCP objects; new articles are frequently written by contributors. 

The SCP Wiki contains over 4,200 short stories referred to as "Foundation Tales". The stories are set within the larger SCP universe, and often focus on the exploits of various Foundation staff members, SCP entities and objects, among other recurring characters and settings. Gregory Burkart, writing for Blumhouse Productions, noted that some of the Foundation Tales had a dark and bleak tone, while others were "surprisingly light-hearted".

The SCP universe has neither a central canon nor the ability to establish one due to its community-oriented nature, but stories on the wiki are often linked together to create larger narratives. Contributors have the ability to create "canons", which are clusters of SCPs and Foundation Tales with similar locations, characters, or central plots; many of these canons have hub pages that explain their basic concept and provide information such as timelines and character lists.

The genres of the SCP Wiki have variously been described as science fiction, urban fantasy, horror and creepypasta.

Community

The SCP Foundation originated in the "paranormal" /x/ forum of 4chan in 2007, where the very first SCP file, SCP-173, was posted by an anonymous user (later identified as Moto42), accompanied by an image of the sculpture "Untitled 2004" by Japanese artist Izumi Kato. Although displeased with the unlicensed use of his art, Kato allowed the use of the photo explicitly for the noncommercial purposes of the community. Initially a stand-alone short story, many additional SCP files were created shortly after; these new SCPs copied SCP-173's style and were set within the same fictional universe. A stand-alone wiki was created in January 2008 on the EditThis wiki hosting service to display the SCP articles. The EditThis website did not have moderators, or the ability to delete articles. Members communicated through individual article talk pages and the /x/ board; the website lacked a central discussion forum. In July 2008, the SCP Wiki was transferred to its current Wikidot website after EditThis switched to a paid model. "Untitled 2004" was removed from the entry for SCP-173 in 2022. 

The current Wikidot website contains numerous standard wiki features such as keyword searches and article lists. The wiki also contains a news hub, guides for writers and a central discussion forum. The wiki is moderated by staff teams; each team is responsible for a different function such as community outreach and discipline. Wikidot users are required to submit an application before they are allowed to post content. Every article on the wiki is assigned a discussion page, where members can evaluate and provide constructive criticism on submitted stories. The discussion pages are frequently used by authors to improve their stories. Members also have the ability to "upvote" articles they like and to "downvote" articles they dislike; articles that receive too many net downvotes are deleted. Writers from the Daily Dot and Bustle have noted that the website maintains strict quality control standards, and that sub-par content tends to be quickly removed.

The Wikidot website routinely holds creative writing contests to encourage submissions. For example, in November 2014, the SCP Wiki held a "Dystopia Contest" in which its members were encouraged to submit writings about the Foundation set in a bleak or degraded world. The website has also held seven themed contests for the opening of new Series, wherein the most-upvoted submission is listed at the beginning of the Series and the submissions of runner-ups are listed under an available number of their authors' choosings. As of Series VIII, the contest themes have covered urban legends, science fiction, eldritch horror, history, mystery, nature, and luck.

Apart from the original English wiki, 15 official foreign language branches exist, and some of their articles have been translated into English. The Wanderer's Library is a sister site and spin-off of the SCP Wiki. It uses the same setting as the SCP universe, but is made up of fantastical stories rather than scientific reports. The SCP community also maintains a role-playing site, a forum on Reddit, and accounts on Facebook and Twitter.

Reception
The SCP Foundation has received largely positive reviews. Michelle Starr of CNET praised the creepy nature of the stories. Gavia Baker-Whitelaw, writing for the Daily Dot, praised the originality of the wiki and described it as the "most uniquely compelling horror writing on the Internet". She noted that the series rarely contained gratuitous gore. Rather, the horror of the series was often established through the reports' "pragmatic" and "deadpan" style, as well as through the inclusion of detail. Lisa Suhay, writing for the Christian Science Monitor, also noted the SCP Wiki's "tongue-in-cheek style".

Alex Eichler, writing for io9, noted that the series had varying levels of quality and that some of the reports were dull or repetitive. However, he praised the SCP stories for not becoming overly dark, and for containing more light-hearted reports. Additionally, he praised the wide variety of concepts covered in the report and said that the wiki contained writings that would appeal to all readers. Leigh Alexander, writing for The Guardian, noted that the wiki's voting system allows readers to easily locate content which "the community thinks are best and most scary."

Winston Cook-Wilson, writing for Inverse, compared the SCP stories to the writings of American author H. P. Lovecraft. Like Lovecraft, SCP casefiles generally lack action sequences and are written in a pseudo-academic tone. Cook-Wilson argued that both Lovecraft's works and those of the SCP Wiki were strengthened by the tensions between their detached scientific tone and the unsettling, horrific nature of the stories being told.

Bryan Alexander, writing in The New Digital Storytelling, stated that the SCP Foundation is possibly "the most advanced achievement of wiki storytelling" due to the large-scale and recurring process through which the wiki's user-base creates literary content.

Media inspired by the SCP Foundation
The works present on the SCP Foundation website have been the subject of numerous independent adaptations and inspired some original works:

Adaptations of the SCP universe
Films and videos (animation)
 Confinement (2017-2019) is an animated black comedy horror web series on YouTube, created by the animator "Lord Bung". The series focuses on the misadventures of Connor, an immortal human SCP prisoner whose anomalous ability to instantaneously resurrect himself from any cause of death is frequently exploited by the Foundation, who often use him like a D-class test subject to interact with various highly dangerous SCPs.

Films and videos (live-action)
 SCP: Overlord (2020) is a 35-minute action horror thriller short film on YouTube, directed by Stephen Hancock and written by Evan Muir. The plot involves a team of Foundation agents raiding and investigating a house occupied by a local cult, which performed occult rituals that have resulted in anomalous activity.

Literature (comics)
 SCP-5000 WHY - The Graphic Novel (2021) is a 120-page graphic novel adaptation of SCP-5000 - Why? (a contest-winning entry) written by Tanhony and illustrated by DRDOBERMANN. The novel focuses on technician Pietro Wilson surviving in an alternate universe where, for unknown reasons, the SCP Foundation has declared war against humanity and is releasing SCP objects to assure human extinction. Funded through Kickstarter, the novel was published by Discordia Publishing in August 2021.

Literature (novels)
 SCP Foundation: Iris Through the Looking-Glass (2018-2020) is a light novel series written by Akira and illustrated by Sidu. The book focuses on a boy who is kidnapped by the SCP Foundation after he sees a picture of Iris Thompson, a girl designated SCP-105, in every book he opens; the boy and Iris are forced to cooperate to escape the Foundation. The novel series began publication in Japan in September 2018, and was released by Seven Seas Entertainment in North America in January 2020.
 There Is No Antimemetics Division (2021) is a SCP sci-fi horror story written and self-published by Sam "qntm" Hughes. The novel focuses on the concept of "antimemes", ideas and entities that censor themselves through memory loss, data corruption, and other anomalous means, and more specifically the invasion of an antimemetic entity that feeds on information.

Theater
 Welcome to the Ethics Committee (2014) is a stage play that was performed in Dublin at the Smock Alley Theatre in October 2014. The play focused on the SCP Foundation's Ethics Committee, a body that tries to limit unethical containment procedures.

Video games
 SCP-087 (2012) is a short horror game about walking down the stairs of SCP-087.
 SCP – Containment Breach (2012), one of the most popular games based on the SCP Foundation, was released by Finnish developer Joonas Rikkonen in 2012. The player character is D-9341, an unarmed D-class who attempts to escape from a containment facility while evading armed Foundation guards and escaped SCPs, including SCP-173. The game includes a blink function, which makes the player close their eyes but allows SCP-173 to approach.
 SCP: Secret Laboratory (2017) is a multiplayer game based on Containment Breach. Players have the option of playing as a breached SCP, an escaping scientist, a D-class, a Mobile Task Force Operative or the attacking Chaos Insurgency.
 SCP: Pandemic (2022) is a multiplayer co-op first-person shooter in development by Affray Interactive. Set in the alternate universe of SCP-5000 - Why?, players perform missions on behalf of various factions against the Foundation, which has become genocidal and seeks the annihilation of humanity.
 SCP: Secret Files (2022) is an episodic horror adventure game in development by GameZoo Studios. The player plays through chapters that each cover different excursions into the SCP Foundation's operations with the bizarre and abnormal.

Other original works
Video games
 Lobotomy Corporation (2018), a management video game by Project Moon, was released in April 2018. Inspired by the SCP Foundation, the titular Lobotomy Corporation contains and harvests energy from supernatural "Abnormalities", and handling containment breaches is a major aspect of the gameplay.
 Control (2019), a video game created by Remedy Entertainment, was first revealed at E3 2018 and released in August 2019. The video game was heavily influenced by the SCP Foundation, with the game centered on a fictional Federal Bureau of Control that collects mundane objects imbued with paranormal influence to study and keep secure.

See also
 Creepypasta
 Lovecraftian horror
 Men in Black
 The X-Files

Explanatory notes

References

Citations

General and cited references

External links
 
 Text-only archive of the earliest-known SCP-173 post on 4chan, obtained from the 4Chan Threads Text Archive

 
Creative Commons-licensed websites
Creepypasta
Dark fantasy
Fiction about memory erasure and alteration
Fiction about monsters
Fictional intelligence agencies
Fictional laboratories
Fictional monster hunters
Fictional paramilitary organizations
Fictional paranormal investigators
Fictional prisons
Fictional secret societies
Fictional universes
Human experimentation in fiction
Internet memes introduced in 2007
Internet properties established in 2008
Lovecraftian horror
Multimedia collaborative fiction
Paranormal fiction
Science fantasy
Science fiction horror
Speculative fiction websites
Urban fantasy
Weird fiction
Wiki communities